The 2020 Walsh Cup was an early-season inter-county hurling competition based in the Irish province of Leinster.

Seven counties compete – six from Leinster, Galway from Connacht and none from Ulster. No third-level college teams took part. Six other counties from Leinster and Ulster play in the second-ranked Kehoe Cup.

It took place in December 2019 and January 2020.

Wexford were the winners.

Competition format

Three teams receive a bye to the semi-finals – Kilkenny, Galway and Wexford. The remaining four teams compete in an initial group stage with each team playing the other teams once. Two points are awarded for a win and one for a draw. The group winners advance to the semi-finals. If the semi-final or final games are drawn, a penalty shoot-out is used to decide the winner; there is no extra time played.

Fixtures and results

Round-robin

Finals

References

Walsh Cup
Walsh Cup (hurling)